Yokaty Perez Flores (born 6 August 1998 in Santo Domingo) is a volleyball player from the Dominican Republic.

She played the 2018 FIVB Volleyball Women's Nations League, and the 2017 FIVB Volleyball Women's U23 World Championship.

Clubs 

  Los Cachorros (2018)

References

External links 

 FIVB profile
 2016 U20 NORCECA Continental Championship: DOM vs. CUB: Yokaty Perez

1998 births
Living people
Dominican Republic women's volleyball players
Sportspeople from Santo Domingo